Hua Chi Pao ('Flame of the Revolution') was a Chinese language daily newspaper, published from Jakarta, Indonesia between 1964 and October 1965. The newspaper was tied to the Indonesian Nationalist Party (PNI). Hua Chi Pao had a circulation of around 10,000 copies.

References

Chinese-language newspapers
Defunct newspapers published in Indonesia
Mass media in Jakarta
Publications established in 1964
Publications disestablished in 1965